Sponsors Peak is a mountain, over 1,600 m, at the west side of the mouth of Victoria Upper Glacier, in Victoria Land. Named by the Victoria University of Wellington Antarctic Expedition (VUWAE) (1958–59) after sponsors who materially assisted the expedition.

References

Mountains of Victoria Land
McMurdo Dry Valleys